Alexander Samizadeh (born 10 November 1998) is an Iranian professional footballer who plays as a forward for Hyde. He has previously played for Bolton Wanderers, Chorley, Kilmarnock and Altrincham.

Early life
Alexander Samizadeh was born in Iran  and moved to England in December 2013.

Club career

Bolton Wanderers
Samizadeh started his career with Bolton Wanderers, progressing through their youth teams. He made his first team debut on 5 April 2016, coming on as a substitute for Kaiyne Woolery at Brentford in the Football League Championship.

Chorley
In November 2016, Samizadeh joined National League North side Chorley on a two-month work experience loan. He scored on his debut.

Kilmarnock
On 14 July 2017, Bolton announced that Samizadeh had been released and that he was joining Scottish Premiership side Kilmarnock. Samizadeh made his first appearance for the club on the same day, coming on as a second-half substitute in a Scottish League Cup match. Samizadeh was released by Kilmarnock in May 2018, at the end of his contract.

Curzon Ashton
On 14 August 2018, Samizadeh signed for Curzon Ashton and made his debut that night coming off the bench against Alfreton Town.

Wealdstone
Samizadeh signed for Wealdstone in December 2018 and played two matches.

Burgess Hill Town
In January 2019 he signed for Burgess Hill Town, scoring on his debut for the club.

Colne
He signed for Colne on 12 September 2020.

Leatherhead
In August 2021 Samizadeh signed for Leatherhead and scored a hat-trick on his debut.

Altrincham
In July 2022 Samizadeh signed for Altrincham after a successful trial period with the club.  In October 2022, it was announced he had left the club.

Personal life
In October 2020 Samizadeh and three others were accused of providing Iranian nationals with false identification and travel documents, with a view to helping them enter the UK illegally. He stood for trial where it was stated he had a false identity known as Mohammad Hossein Samizadeh in Italy in which he would use to facilitate the illegal immigrations by opening them bank accounts and make travel arrangements by having them use the false identities. His laptop also contained images of other people's stolen passports. He denied all statements.

Samizadeh has been the CEO of Royale Residential since 30 October 2020.

Career statistics

References

External links

1998 births
Living people
Iranian footballers
Iranian expatriate footballers
Iranian emigrants to the United Kingdom
English people of Iranian descent
British Asian footballers
Association football forwards
English Football League players
National League (English football) players
Northern Premier League players
Isthmian League players
Scottish Professional Football League players
Bolton Wanderers F.C. players
Kilmarnock F.C. players
Chorley F.C. players
Sportspeople of Iranian descent
Curzon Ashton F.C. players
Wealdstone F.C. players
Burgess Hill Town F.C. players
Colne F.C. players
Leatherhead F.C. players
Altrincham F.C. players